Dykes Peak is a peak,  high, at the head of Victoria Upper Glacier,  east of Skew Peak, in the Clare Range of Victoria Land. It was mapped by the United States Geological Survey from surveys and from U.S. Navy aerial photographs, 1947–62, and was named by the Advisory Committee on Antarctic Names in 1974 for Leonard H. Dykes, who was associated for nearly 20 years with successive Antarctic co-ordinating committees within the U.S. Government.

References 

Mountains of Victoria Land
Scott Coast